François de Roux (7 March 1897 – 17 July 1954) was a French writer, winner of the 1935 Prix Renaudot.

Life 
Born in Aix-en-Provence, de Roux married Odette Magne.

A friend of Jean Paulhan and Paul Valéry, he began his literary career in 1924 at the age of 27. From 1924 to 1935, he contributed to La Nouvelle Revue française with articles on Jacques Rivière, Jacques de Lacretelle, Colette, etc.

In 1935 he published  at Éditions Gallimard for which he obtained the Prix Renaudot on December 5, 1935. On December 15, 1935, at a dinner at Drouant's house gathering the ten winners of the Renaudot Prize since 1926 (Charles Braibant, Philippe Hériat, Louis-Ferdinand Céline...), de Roux put forward the idea of publishing a collection of ten short stories by the winners, presented by each of the jurors. It was adopted. The volume was published in the following year.

The Éditions Robert Laffont succeeded in attracting François de Roux with Amours perdues in 1942 and L'Ombrageuse (in 1942 too).

De Roux died in Paris at age 57.

Work 
 1935:  — Prix Renaudot
 1938: Bru: Amours perdues
 1945: L'Ombrageuse
 1950: Les Absentes
 1952: La Jeunesse de Lyautey

References 

20th-century French non-fiction writers
Prix Renaudot winners
writers from Aix-en-Provence
1897 births
1954 deaths